The Princess and the Unicorn is a children's fantasy novel by British-born American author Carol Hughes, who also wrote Jack Black and the Ship of Thieves. The novel was published in hardcover on February 24, 2009, by Random House Books for Young Readers.

Plot summary
This novel follows two characters: Princess Eleanor of England and a young fairy named Joyce. Joyce lives in Swinley Forest with a community of other fairies who rely on the forest's unicorn for survival. One day, Joyce follows the unicorn to the edge of the forest and is spotted by Princess Eleanor. The princess chases her inside and finds the unicorn, only to take it home with her to Swinley Castle. Knowing it is her responsibility to retrieve the unicorn, Joyce sets out on a journey to bring the unicorn home. Things get a little more complicated when the Princess takes the unicorn with her to London.

Meanwhile, the princess is not living the dream life that most little girls would assume. She rarely gets to see her parents, who are too busy with their affairs to tuck her in bed at night. And her once lovable nanny is brewing a deceptive get-rich-quick scheme behind the princess's back.

References 

2009 American novels
Children's fantasy novels
American children's novels
American fantasy novels
Novels set in London
Fiction about unicorns
Random House books
2009 children's books